Ian Gardner (born May 5, 1981), nicknamed The Cobra because of his slithering movements on the boxing ring, is a junior-middleweight boxer who was born and raised in Saint John, New Brunswick, Canada, but now resides in Halifax Nova Scotia, Canada.

Gardner is one of just six men who have gone the distance with the WBA, WBC, IBO and IBF middleweight champion; Gennadiy Golovkin. He also fought world champions Arthur Abraham and Chad Dawson.

Professional boxing record

References

External links
 Gardner Promotions Home of Ian "The Cobra" Gardner with details about his Promotional Team plus News and Information.
 

Black Canadian boxers
Light-middleweight boxers
Living people
Canadian male boxers
Sportspeople from Saint John, New Brunswick
1981 births